Möhlmann or Moehlmann is a German surname literally meaning someone who worked or lived at a mill. Variants: Mollmann, :de:Möllmann, Mohlman, etc.

Notable people with the surname include:

Benno Möhlmann (born 1954), German footballer and manager
Gerrit Möhlmann (born 1950), Dutch cyclist
Nicholas Moehlmann (born 1938), American politician
Pleuni Möhlmann (born 1984), Dutch cyclist

References

German-language surnames
Occupational surnames

de:Möhlmann